Gentiana Ismajli (born 12 April 1984), known professionally as Genta Ismajli, is a Kosovo-Albanian singer, songwriter, and actress.

Career
Ismajli was born in Gjilan to an Albanian family. Before Genta was born, they moved to Gjilan. A few months after her birth, her parents decided to move to Chicago, Illinois in the United States, where she was raised. At the age of 19, she went to Kosovo and released the single "Dridhem". The song became a hit, which ignited Ismajli's music career. She later relocated permanently to Kosovo, and has participated in several music competitions, both in Albania and Kosovo. She won Kënga Magjike in 2005 with the song "S'dua tjetër" composed by Adrian Hila, an Albanian composer, receiving 292 points. Ismajli continued her career in Albania and Kosovo for three more years. She had great success; she then went back to the United States to spend some time with her parents, and came back to Albania with new projects in mind.

Ismajli sings mostly commercial pop songs, similar to other Balkan pop. Lascivious stage movements with challenging clothes are a part of her image. Ismajli is known for her energetic dance performances as well as catchy pop and hip hop rhythms. She participated in the first edition of Dancing with the Stars (Albania), where she ranked second overall.

She began singing in the English language, recording songs that were released in her then-upcoming 2008 album, her first all-English album. Many of these songs leaked onto the internet prior to the release of the album. The majority of the songs on the album were written by American songwriter Kara DioGuardi. In her interviews, Ismajli says she wants to be a famous singer, and in America she is working with known composers and songwriters.

She released a half English, half Albanian album in 2011 entitled Guximi. Her English songs included "One Shot", "Accident", "Something to Remember Me By", "Idolize Me", "Intoxicated", "Choose", and her debut English single, "Planet Me", written and produced by Kara DioGuardi

Discography

Albums
Mos më Shiko (2004)
Pranoje
Pse Nuk Vallëzoni?
Unë të Dua
Mos më Shiko
Melodi Pa Fund

Dridhem

Më e Fortë Jam Unë (2005)
Unë Jam Fati Yt
Për Ty Jam e Vdekur
Zor Me Mu' e Keq Pa Mu'
Pse të Dua Ty
M'puq, M'puq
S'do të Pres
M'u Largo
Gabova
Luj Me Mu

Posesiv (2006)
Një Lutje
Posesiv
Nuk Harrohet
Hajde Bukuri
Shko
Largohu
E Kam Shpirtin Eksplosiv
Fjalë Me Bisht
Lutem
Me Hare

Zero Zero (2008)
Një Her' në Vit
S'dua t'jem e Tjetër Kujt
Zero Zero
E Pamundur
Qeni që Leh
Sa Ilaqe
Relax
Jan's Picikato

Guximi (2011)
Guximi
One Shot
Hajde, Qka po Pret
Pa Ty
Pini Sonte
Pse Ike?
Mos u Ndal
Accident
Number One (Remix)
Shkune Tune (Remix)

Guximi (Bonus Tracks Version) (2011)
Guximi
One Shot
Hajde, Qka po Pret
Pa Ty
Pini Sonte
Pse Ike?
Mos u Ndal
Accident
Something to Remember Me By
Idolize Me
Choose
Intoxicated
Planet Me
Something to Remember Me By (Remix)
Number One (Remix)
Shkune Tune (Remix)
Outro

Compilation albums
Dekada (2014)

Awards and nominations

Kënga Magjike

|-
|rowspan="2"|2005
|rowspan="2"|"Nuk Dua Tjeter"
|First Prize
|
|-
|Internet Prize
|
|-
||2014
||"Maje"
|Best Performer
|
|}

Kult Awards

|-
||2009
||"Zero Zero"
|Best Album of the Year
|
|}

Netet e Klipit Shqiptar

|-
||2006
||"Pse të dua ty"
|Best Video / First Prize
|
|}

Poli Fest

|-
|rowspan="3"|2006
|rowspan="3"|"Me hare"
|Internet Prize
|
|-
|Public Prize
|
|-
|Second Prize
|
|}

Video Fest Awards

|-
|rowspan="2"|2005
|rowspan="2"|"Pranoje"
|Best Female
|
|-
|Best Popular Video
|
|-
|rowspan="2"|2006
|rowspan="2"|"Luj me mu"
|Best Popular Video
|
|-
|Best Production
|
|-
|rowspan="3"|2006
|rowspan="3"|"Pse te du"
|Best Female
|
|-
|Best Camera
|
|-
|Best Director
|
|-
||2007
||"Posesiv"
|Best Female
|
|-
||2008
||"Sa llaqe"
|Best Pop Folk Video
|
|-
||2010
||"Si panter I zi"
|Best Performance
|
|-
|rowspan="2"|2012
|rowspan="2"|"Guximi (ft.Dalool)"
|Best Dance
|
|-
|RTV 21 PLUS Prize
|
|-
||2013
||"Ole Ole(ft.Dj Blunt & Real 1)"
|Best Dance
|
|-
||2014
||"Anuloje"
|Best Pop Folk Video
|
|}

Zhurma Show Awards

|-
|rowspan="2"|2008
|rowspan="2"|"Një Herë Në Vit"
|Best Pop & Rock Video
|
|-
|Top 10 Vip
|
|-
||2009
||"Si Panter I Zi"
|Best Pop Video
|
|-
|rowspan="2"|2010
|rowspan="2"|"Shkune Tune"
|Best Video / First Prize
|
|-
|Best Pop 
|
|-
|rowspan="3"|2011
|rowspan="3"|""Guximi (ft.Dalool)"
|Best Dance
|
|-
|Best Album
|
|-
|Best Song
|
|-
|rowspan="2"|2012
|rowspan="2"|"Ole Ole (ft. DJ Blunt & Real 1)"
|Best Video / First Prize
|
|-
|Best Song
|
|-
|rowspan="2"|2013
|rowspan="2"|"Si ty nuk ka"
|Best Pop
|
|-
|Best Video / First Prize
|
|-
|rowspan="2"|2014
|rowspan="2"|"Anuloje"
|Best Female
|
|-
|Best Pop
|
|-
|rowspan="2"|2016
|rowspan="2"|"Shake it (ft.Etnon)"
|Best Collaboration
|
|-
|Best Song
|
|}

References

21st-century Albanian women singers
Kosovo Albanians
Kosovan singers
Kosovan actresses
People from Gjilan
Yugoslav emigrants to the United States
American people of Albanian descent
American people of Kosovan descent
American women pop singers
American women songwriters
Singers from Chicago
Living people
1984 births
21st-century American women singers
21st-century American singers
Kënga Magjike winners